Propionic anhydride is an organic compound with the formula (CH3CH2CO)2O. This simple acid anhydride is a colourless liquid.  It is a widely used reagent in organic synthesis as well as for producing specialty derivatives of cellulose.

Synthesis
Industrial route to propionic anhydride involves thermal dehydration, driving off the water by distillation:
2 CH3CH2CO2H  →  (CH3CH2CO)2O  +  H2O
Another routes is the Reppe carbonylation of ethylene with propionic acid and nickel carbonyl as the catalyst:
CH2=CH2  + CH3CH2CO2H +  CO →  (CH3CH2CO)2O

Propionic anhydride has also been prepared by dehydration of propionic acid using ketene:
 2 CH3CH2CO2H  +  CH2=C=O  →  (CH3CH2CO)2O  +  CH3CO2H

Safety
Propanoic anhydride is strong smelling and corrosive, and will cause burns on contact with skin. Vapour can burn eyes and lungs.

Legal Status
Due to its potential use as a precursor in the synthesis of fentanyl and fentanyl analogs, propanoic anhydride is regulated by the United States Drug Enforcement Administration as a List I chemical under the Controlled Substances Act.

References

Carboxylic anhydrides
Lachrymatory agents